William Gollar (11 March 1858 – 31 August 1916) was a New Zealand cricketer. He played one first-class match for Otago in 1890/91.

Gollar was born at Hobart in Tasmania in 1858. He worked as a baker and was a member of the Albion Cricket Club in Dunedin. Following his death at the age of 58 in 1916 an obituary was published in the 1917 edition of Wisden Cricketers' Almanack.

References

External links
 

1858 births
1916 deaths
New Zealand cricketers
Otago cricketers
Cricketers from Hobart